Lanfranc (c. 1005–1089) was an Archbishop of Canterbury. Lanfranc may also refer to:

 Lanfranc Cigala (fl. 1235–1257), Genoese nobleman, judge, and man of letters
 Lanfranc of Milan (c.1250-1306), surgeon
 HMHS Lanfranc, a British First World War hospital ship
 The Archbishop Lanfranc Academy, secondary school in Croydon, UK
 1961 Holtaheia Vickers Viking crash, redirect from Lanfranc School air accident.

See also
Lanfranco (disambiguation)